William Frank Purdy (1872 – 1929) was a British trade unionist.

Based in Newcastle-upon-Tyne, Purdy was active in the Shipconstructors' and Shipwrights' Association, and became its Assistant General Secretary by 1920.  He succeeded Alexander Wilkie as the union's Acting General Secretary shortly before Wilkie's death in 1928, but Purdy himself died the following year before he could stand for election to the permanent post.

Purdy was also a member of the National Executive Committee of the Labour Party.  He moved that George Wardle preside over the 1917 party conference as acting chair, and Purdy was then elected as chairman for 1917/18.

References

1872 births
1929 deaths
Chairs of the Labour Party (UK)
British trade union leaders
Trade unionists from Newcastle upon Tyne